Events in the year 2019 in Kerala

Incumbents

Events

January 
1 Jan - Vanitha Mathil, world's fourth largest human chain ever made, and the largest formed solely by women under leadership of left organizations between Kasaragod and Thiruvananthapuram to uphold gender equality and protest against gender discrimination.

2 Jan - Two women, Bindu Ammini and Kanaka Durga, belonging to the traditionally barred age group entered the holy shrine of Sabarimala.

3 Jan -

 State wide Hartal by Sabarimala Karma Samiti and Hindu right wing organisations held.
 Rashtriya Swayamsevak Sangh activist throw bomb at Nedumangad Police Station.
 Hindu right wing protestors were attacked by left wing activists during Hartal at Edappal.
15 Jan - Prime Minister Narendra Modi inaugurates Kollam Bypass on National Highway 66.

February 
19 Feb - Municipality of Alappuzha imposes a fine of Rs. 2.73 crores on Lake Palace Resort owned by Thomas Chandy for engaging in illegal constructions and carrying out encroachment on Vembanad backwaters.

April 
23 Apr - 2019 Indian general election in Kerala

May 
23 May - United Democratic Front (Kerala) sweeps parliament elections in Kerala by winning 19 out of 20 constituencies.

July 
12 July - Add'l Chief Secretary, Government of Kerala passes a controversial order that reduces fine imposed by Municipality of Alappuzha on Lake Palace Resort owned by Thomas Chandy for encroachment from 1.17 crores to 34 lakhs.

August 
8 Aug - 2019 Kerala floods

22 Aug - Principal Sessions Court Kottayam calls 2018 Kevin murder as Honor killing and convicts 10 out of the 14 accused in the case.

September 
26 Sept - Kerala Police enters St. Mary's Orthodox Syrian Cathedral, Piravom and forcefully evicted Jacobite faction from church premises following ongoing conflict between Jacobite and Orthodox factions following 2017 Supreme Court verdict that give more rights to Orthodox group.

October 
5 Oct –  The key accused in Koodathayi cyanide murders murders, Jolly was arrested by Kerala Police.

28 Oct - Three Maoists killed by Kerala Police at Manchakatti, in Palakkad district.

November 
20 Nov - A ten-year-old girl died after Snakebite from classroom in Sultan Bathery.

December 
6 December - Kerala Bank launched by Pinarayi Vijayan.

31 Dec - Kerala Legislative Assembly passes resolution against Citizenship (Amendment) Act, 2019.

Deaths

January 
14 - Lenin Rajendran, 67, Film director.

February 
1 - Thuppettan, 89, writer.

March 
14 - Rosamma Chacko, 91, politician.

27 - Ashitha (writer), 62

April 
3 - V. Viswanatha Menon, 92, politician

9 - K. M. Mani, 86, politician

13 - D. Babu Paul, 78, Bureaucrat

May 
9 - Eranjoli Moosa, 79, Mappila song singer.

17 - Kadavoor Sivadasan, 87, politician

July 
12 - M. J. Radhakrishnan, cinematographer.

26 - Attoor Ravi Varma, 88, poet

September 
17 - Sathaar, 67, actor.

October 
1 - C. K. Menon, 70, entrepreneur.

November 
12 - Raju Mathew, 82, film producer.

December 
10 - Lily Thomas, 92, lawyer.

20 - Thomas Chandy, politician and business man

21 - Ramachandra Babu, 72, cinematographer.

See also 

 History of Kerala
 2020 in Kerala
 2019 in India

References 

2010s in Kerala